Pasighat is the headquarters of East Siang district in the Indian state of Arunachal Pradesh. The Government of India included Pasighat in the Smart Cities Mission development scheme in June 2017.

It is also an Advance Landing Ground (ALG) of Indian Air Force.

History 
Pasighat was founded in 1911 by the British Raj as a gateway to administrative convenience of the greater Abor Hills and the north area in general. Primarily there were settlements of Adi tribesmen who are still living in the villages in and around Pasighat. The year 2011 marked 100 years of its existence.

Cognizance of Pasighat emerged due to the last Anglo-Abor War that was fought in 1912 subsequent to the fourth Anglo-Abor War in 1894. This necessitated the first-ever administrative headquarters being established here with an Assistant Political Officer posted. In the post-independence era, Pasighat is credited with the first Airfield (near Paglek, P. I. Line) established in 1946.

The first Agricultural Institute in Arunachal Pradesh was also established at Pasighat in 1950. Other forms of later infrastructural development include:
 General Hospital (established 1954, although some claim it as old as the town itself)
 Co-operative society Ltd (1957)
 Nurse Training Centre (affiliated to General Hospital) 
 Jawaharlal Nehru College - the first-ever College in Arunachal Pradesh (established 3 July 1964)
 The first-ever All India Radio Station in the State in 1966.

Early proponents for shifting the state capital from Shillong (the then NEFA), underlined Pasighat's better infrastructure. However, the privilege was lost to the present capital Itanagar in 1974. The only significant development in Pasighat that came after that was the College Of Horticulture and Forestry Central Agriculture University established on 7 March 2001.

Geography
Pasighat has a typical lowland Northeast India humid subtropical climate (Köppen Cwa) a little too cool to qualify as a tropical monsoon climate (Am).

The unique trough-like features surrounded by high hills on three sides make Pasighat ideal for attracting rain-bearing clouds that come in from the Assam plain. Winter is marked by strong, cool, dry northeasterly winds from the Siberian High, which make Pasighat fog-free even in winter. Days during the “cool” season from November to February are generally warm and clear, whilst the “hot” spring season from March to May sees an increasing frequency of heavy thunder downpours and very warm to hot, humid weather with even mornings warm.

The Brahmaputra River emerges from the foothills under the name of Dihang or Siang in Pasighat. It enters the plains from here, in the west of Sadiya town in Arunachal Pradesh. Flowing south-west, it receives its main left-bank tributaries, viz. Dibang and Lohit; thereafter, it is known as the Brahmaputra in the plains. Then it crosses the Pasighat area heading for the Assam plains.

Climate

Economy 
Agriculture is the main occupation of the local people. Rice is the main food crop produced in the area. There are several large tea gardens in the vicinity of the town which attract workers from all over the region. Lumbering was a big sustaining industry till the Supreme Court clamped down on the industry during the 1990s. There is also a bit of tourism in Pasighat, being the oldest town in Arunachal Pradesh. Agriculture, horticulture, and tourism continue to be the main source of economy for the town.

Demography

As of 2011 India Census, Pasighat had a population of 24,656. Males constitute 50.62% (12,482 males) of the population and females 49.37% (12,174 females). Pasighat has an average literacy rate of 79.6%: male literacy is 85.33%, and female literacy is 73.74%. In Pasighat, 12% of the population is under 6 years of age.

Pasighat is predominantly inhabited by the Adi people.

Languages
 

According to 2011 census, Adi was the most spoken language with 9,074 speakers followed by Nepali at 4,269, Bengali at 2,621, Bhojpuri at 2,511, Hindi at 1,905 and Assamese at 1,181.

Culture

The people of Pasighat celebrate a variety of festivals. Solung, Aran, and Etor are important festivals. Legend has it that the festival regarded as Solung, which is the principal festival of the Adi, came into existence when the Goddess of wealth, Kiine-Naane, had asked them in person to carry out this worship or 'puja'.

Solung is celebrated by the Adis for five days in the month of September. The first day or the Solung Gidi Dogin is the day when they prepare for this event. Doreph Long, the second day is the day of animal slaughters. Binnyat Binam or the third day is the day of prayers. Taktor of Ekoph is the fourth day and on this day arms and ammunition are manufactured. Miri or the fifth day is the day of farewell. The songs that are sung during Solung are the lyrics of Solung Abang that show the life of humans, animals, plants, etc.

The Adi people are also known for their colorful Ponung dance and war dance called Taapu.

Transport connectivity

Pasighat is connected by the NH-515 and have frequent services from Guwahati, Lakhimpur and Itanagar. Waterways crossing the Brahmaputra River from Dibrugarh by ferry to Oryamghat that is situated at a distance of 32 km from Pasighat and can take a bus or taxi. Nearest rail head is at Murkongselek which is terminal station of the Rangia-Murkongselek broad gauge track.

The 227-km Murkongselek-Pasighat-Tezu-Rupai line is being undertaken as a strategic project. The rail head is proposed to be extended up to Pasighat. The BG railway line will link North-Assam area with Pasighat town, the district headquarter of East Siang of Arunachal, located at a rail route distance of 26.5 km. About 24.5 km of the route falls in Arunachal territory. The Rangia - Murkongselek BG conversion (with extension up to Pasighat) project was one of the two major rail projects in Northeast announced by Prime Minister Manmohan Singh during 2010. This broad gauge line is supposed to be proceeding on to Roing, Parsuramkund, Rupai, and other places in the state. A preliminary engineering-traffic survey for the Pasighat-Tezu-Parshuram Kund was conducted by Northeast Frontier Railways at the request of the state government.Arunachal Pradesh State Transport Services (APSTS) is another means of transportation in the district which is linked with other districts and nearby villages. APSTS buses are also run from Pasighat to Itanagar, the capital of the state, from Pasighat to Shillong, Meghalaya via Guwahati on the daily basis. Bus services are available to Guwahati, Assam which are run by private operators. Private-owned Winger and Tata Sumo services also run across the district and run in the other districts. Also, regular flights from Pasighat to Guwahati and Guwahati to Pasighat on selected weekdays have also started since April 2018. Guwahati and Kolkata are connected with Pasighat Airport by Alliance Air.

Tourism

Pasighat is the land of the mighty Siang and indigenous hanging bridges. A waterfall graces the mountain cliffs and chills the vicinity. Attractions in the town include:

 The Daying Ering Wildlife Sanctuary in Arunachal Pradesh, India is one of the most popular wildlife parks of the state. The rest of the area is water. The present land of the sanctuary was mostly donated by the Mebo and Monngu Banngos. It was, is, and will always be popularly called Jopong, which was a named given by locals and land owners in memory and honour of Rutum Jotan Pertin during 1790s. This term was coined by the Pertin-Pannginng friendship and has been accepted by all for the last 225 years.
It stands at a point where River Siyom meets River Siang and the blue waters of Siyom meet the green Siang. Besides above, the district is endowed with some scenic locations particularly on both sides of the Siang. There are also a number of rare plants and herbs which are of medicinal importance. Botanists and Zoologists can have ample scope for study of the rich plant and wildlife resources.
 Bodak Scenic Area: The Bodak-Mebo-Jengging Scenic Area is a popular picnic spot for tourists from neighbouring states, towns, and the residents of Pasighat. The scenic area is a large forested area with villages, agricultural lands within, at about 15 kilometres away from the Pasighat main town. The scenic area is along the highway starting from the Siang Bridge and diverges to Mebo village on the right hand side and to Jengging village on the left hand side. The road to Jenning is much more frequented because of the vistas of the Siang river from the road. Youngsters are frequently seen going on a long drive in this area. The area is also home to the Mïdu Lereng stone monolith. Villagers of the area have shown concern about the garbage generated and destruction to the environment from frequent tourist visits and many regular picnic spots are now taxed by NGOs who maintain the pristine environment. Village level governments of the nearby villages have been very critical over the matter and have erected notices, warnings and appointed members of the village on a rotational basis to keep an eye for possible damages to property, environment, and poaching and trespassing. There are fines in place for the defaulters.
 Kekar Monying: A mountain cliff near Rottung which is an important historical place because it was here that the Adi put up a strong resistance against the British in 1911. The war was a part of a punitive expedition undertaken by the British for murdering Noel Williamson, a political officer in the previous year by Matmur Jamoh, a native of Yagrung village.
 Komsing: A village on the left bank of the Siang is the place of Williamson's murder. A stone epitaph bearing the name of Noel Williamson still lies near the Siang.
 Komlighat used to be a river port at an earlier time. The ghat marks the area of the colonial town of Pasighat which has been submerged into the Siang river following a flood and the river changing its course. Now a popular evening spot, the area is frequented by families, youngsters, and the health conscious for jogging, yoga, etc. The spot is also popular for its street food sold by vendors in the area. The ghat provides a wonderful view of the river and the hills surrounding the Pasighat plains. The distant hills are covered with snow in winters. The river bank in the area is very close to the floodplain, which makes for an excellent view with a large stretch of riverine beach. Paradoxically, the lower flood plain also makes it susceptible to flooding during the monsoon and thus, has rows of embankments and other flood control mechanisms.
 Pasighat Buddhist Temple: Located in the opposite side of the air strip from the highway, this small temple serves as the only Buddhist worship place in Pasighat.
 East Siang District Museum: Also located in the opposite side of the Pasighat Airport, it is the district museum of the East Siang District.
 Adi Baane Kebang Headquarters: Pasighat also houses the headquarters of the Adi Baane Kebang, which acts as the de facto cultural parliament governing the cultural, linguistic, traditional aspects of the Adi people.
 Pasighat Airport is a military airstrip, which has been upgraded and is also being used as a civilian airport to cater to the public.
 Gomsi: A cultivation area near Rani Village is another place of historical importance. In June 1996, a team of archaeologists led by Shri T. Tada, Deputy Director, Archaeology of the Research Department conducted a trial excavation and survey in the site. They have found broken pieces of different evidence, of past culture of early medieval period (probably Pre-Ahom).

See also 

 Military bases 
 List of ALGs
 List of Indian Air Force stations
 India-China military deployment on LAC
 List of disputed India-China areas
 Tianwendian
 Ukdungle

 Borders
 Line of Actual Control (LAC)
 Borders of China
 Borders of India
 
 Conflicts
 Sino-Indian conflict
 List of disputed territories of China
 List of disputed territories of India

 Other related topics
 India-China Border Roads
 List of extreme points of India
 Defence Institute of High Altitude Research
 Independent Golden Jubilee Government Higher Secondary School, Pasighat

References

External links

 IAF's ALG
 Town website

 
East Siang district
Cities and towns in East Siang district